Kami Paul (birth name: Kamran Paul) is a Pakistani musician. He is the drummer for the rock band Noori, and also appeared in Coke Studio in seasons 9, season 11, and season 14.

Early life 
Born in Karachi, Paul started experimenting with every utensil and furniture in his house around the age of 8. Paul draws his musical inspirations from Whitesnake, ABBA, Pink Floyd, Bee Gees, and gospel music during his visit to the church. Paul started formal training when he was 13.

Career

Early career 
Kami played for a number of mainstream artists including Zeb and Haniya, Ahmed Jahanzeb, Mekaal Hasan Band, Atif Aslam, Meesha Shafi et al. He is also an active band member of Noori since 2013 till date.

Noori 
Since 2013, Kami Paul has been playing live and recording with Noori. He was also a part of Noori's third studio album "Begum Gul Bakauli Sarfarosh". After joining Noori, Paul has been touring extensively with the band.

Coke Studio 
Kami Paul joined and made his debut in Coke Studio in Season 9 as a guest musician. He then returned to Coke Studio Pakistan (season 11) as a House Band member where he performed in the entire season. Recently, Coke Studio has revealed its lineup for Season 12 and Kami Paul is all set to return to the show as a house band member. Kami Paul is also performing in Coke Studio 12 as a house band member.

Mughal-e-Funk 
Along with playing as a session player for a number of bands and musicians, Kami Paul is also occupied with his personal instrumental project Mughal-e-Funk. The band has also released an album Sultanat. The band comprises Rakae Jamil, Rufus Shahzad, Farhan Ali, and Kami Paul himself.

Discography

Noori 

 Begum Gul Bakaoli Sarfarosh

Coke Studio (Pakistani TV program) 

 Coke Studio Pakistan (season 9) (2016)
 Coke Studio Pakistan (season 11) (2018)

Mughal-e-Funk 

 Aurangzeb

References 

1988 births
Living people
Pakistani drummers